Funaoka Onsen (船岡温泉) is an onsen (public bath house) in Kyoto, Japan.

The building is made out of wood and dates to 1923. The authorities registered it as a Tangible Cultural Property. The front entrance gate features a karahafu undulating curved gable at the top, a feature that can be found often in Japanese castles. The interior has ornately covered panels out of wood which depict mythological stories. It was carved by artists who work for the Imperial Court and it took them around 10 years to complete.

External links 

 Homepage

Buildings and structures completed in 1923
Buildings and structures in Kyoto
Kyoto
Public baths in Japan
Tourist attractions in Kyoto